Mick Hill may refer to:

 Mick Hill (basketball) (born 1978), Australian basketballer
 Mick Hill (footballer) (1947–2008), former Welsh international footballer
 Mick Hill (javelin thrower) (born 1964), former British javelin thrower
 Mick Hill (pool player), British pool player and WEPF Men's Champion of 2004

See also 
 Mike Hill (disambiguation)
 Michael Hill (disambiguation)